Jutulhogget is a  long dry canyon in the municipalities of Alvdal and Rendalen in Innlandet county, Norway. The canyon was created by the rupture of the dam of a proglacial lake and the force of the rushing water leaving the lake carved out the canyon. The canyon was protected as a nature reserve in 1959.

The canyon was formed at the end of the last Ice Age, around  years ago. The proglasial lake Nedre Glomsjø was dammed up by glaciers stopping the water from running southward. As the amount of meltwater rose, it eventually broke through its earthen boundaries and formed a new outlet heading eastward through a weakness zone in the bedrock. The lake drained through to the Rendalen valley, at an estimated . The pressure of the water quickly dug through the rock, and the rock and formed the canyons in a matter of days. To the early settles downstream, this would have been a cataclysmic and sudden event.

References

External links
aukrust.no  
rena.no  

Canyons and gorges of Norway
Landforms of Innlandet
Geology of Norway
Alvdal
Rendalen
First 100 IUGS Geological Heritage Sites